Gašper Markič (born August 22, 1986 in Kranj) is a former Slovenian alpine skier.

At 2006 FIS Junior World Ski Championships he won a silver Super-G medal in Le Massif, Canada. His 2009 World Cup debut performance was in Wengen, Switzerland. He also competed in Downhill at FIS Alpine World Ski Championships 2011.

References

External links 
 
 

1986 births
Living people
Slovenian male alpine skiers
Sportspeople from Kranj